Bondi Junction railway station is located on the Eastern Suburbs line, serving the Sydney suburb of Bondi Junction. It is served by Sydney Trains T4 Eastern Suburbs & Illawarra Line services and NSW TrainLink South Coast Line services.

History

As a long-standing major commercial area in Sydney's east, a railway line had long been considered to Bondi Junction. The suburb was variously proposed to have been the intermediate or the ultimate terminus of an Eastern Suburbs Railway since 1916. In 1967, tenders were awarded for the construction of the Eastern Suburbs line as far as Bondi Junction. Construction began shortly thereafter.

Construction plans
Although a subway station, construction required the demolition of a block of mixed commercial-residential buildings to permit staging of the project, the construction of a works compound and, once the railway was completed, to be the location of the bus interchange facility.

The line was to eventually be constructed to Kingsford, but the first stage would run only so far as Bondi Junction. As the planned interim terminus of the line, terminus facilities were provided at the station. These consisted of a turnback tunnel between the main running tunnels and a trailing crossover.

An underground shopping complex was proposed to be constructed at the concourse level of the station (similar to that which exists at Martin Place). Additionally, an underground walkway would be provided to the then proposed (later constructed) Bondi Junction Plaza shopping centre.

Construction realities
Construction of the Eastern Suburbs Railway generally proceeded from the Erskineville tunnel portals to Bondi Junction. As such Bondi Junction was the last developed station site.

In 1976, the Wran Government sought to reduce costs on the railway's construction. As a result of an inquiry by an Eastern Suburbs Railway Board of Review, a number of recommendations were made and accepted by the government. Relevantly these included:
Eastern Suburbs Railway not be constructed beyond Bondi Junction and the route to Kingsford be abandoned
Line be fully integrated with the Illawarra line (not be run independently)
Shopping centre on the station concourse not be constructed
Tunnel to the Bondi Junction Plaza not be constructed
Level of finish at the station be reduced and only four escalators be provided from the concourse level to the platform level
Scale of the bus interchange be reduced

As a result of these changes, Bondi Junction became the permanent terminus of the Eastern Suburbs and Illawarra railway lines. However no provision was made for an upgraded turnback facility.

Opening
The Eastern Suburbs Railway was opened on 23 June 1979 by the Premier, Neville Wran.

Rebuilding the Bus Interchange

The bus interchange facility opened in 1979 was basic. The location of the station meant the land and airspace on which it was located was highly valuable. This in turn led to various proposal throughout the 1990s to sell the airspace and redevelop the interchange. In 1998, Woollahra Council, then controlling the site of the bus interchange, finalised an agreement to sell the airspace above the site to Meriton who commenced construction of a new bus interchange together with two residential apartment towers and a small shopping centre in April 1999. The new interchange was temporarily opened in September 2000 for the Sydney Olympics but subsequently closed for further work. The new bus interchange, two apartment towers and the shopping centre opened in July 2001. The shopping centre known as Tiffany Plaza (renamed to Meriton Retail Precinct Bondi Junction in 2018) featured a McDonald's outlet, a gym, a child care centre and seven other retailers.

Reconstruction of the bus terminal altered the locations of commuter access to the station concourse. As such, alterations were required to the station concourse. The resulting renovation of Bondi Junction station primarily involved upgrading station staff facilities, the installation of toilets and the general updating of the station, hitherto a time capsule to the 1970s.

The renovation was conducted coincidentally with the Easy Access upgrade to the station and the replacement of the original incandescent lamp platform indicators with plasma display indicators.

Clearways Project upgrade
Constructed as a part of the Rail Clearways Program, a second turnback facility was built. The major work consisted of the construction of a new crossover tunnel on the city side of the station.  This created an X shaped or diamond junction allowing terminating trains to arrive at either platform. The changes allowed the full line capacity of 20 trains per hour to be turned at Bondi Junction, the prior limit being 14.

In addition, extra stabling facilities were provided by utilitising unused sections of tunnels beyond the station. These tunnels were constructed on anticipation of continued tunnelling towards Kingsford. They have had track laid and overhead wire installed for a length of two eight-car trains in each tunnel. This gives a total stabling capacity of five eight-car trains (two in each siding and one in the turnback tunnel).

Complementing the stabling capacity at the station is the erection of a staff meal and waiting room on the platform level.

Construction began on the site in October 2004 with the station was closed and trains terminated at Edgecliff. Commissioning took place in April 2006.

Platforms & services

Transport links
Bondi Junction Interchange All routes are operated by Transdev John Holland except routes 389 and 440 which are operated by Transit Systems.

References

External links

Bondi Junction Station at Transport for New South Wales (Archived 10 June 2019)
Bondi Junction station Public Transport Map Transport for NSW
Turnback construction Flickr gallery

Easy Access railway stations in Sydney
Railway stations in Australia opened in 1979
Railway stations located underground in Sydney
Bondi Junction, New South Wales
Eastern Suburbs railway line